Águia de Marabá Futebol Clube, commonly referred to as Águia de Marabá, is a Brazilian professional club based in Marabá, Pará founded on 22 January 1984. It competes in the Campeonato Brasileiro Série D, the fourth tier of Brazilian football, as well as in the Campeonato Paraense, the top flight of the Pará state football league.

History
The club was founded on January 22, 1982, under the name Águia Esporte Clube and had as its first president sportsman Emivaldo Milhomem, which had the support of Valtemir Pereira Lima to found a college that was created to compete in the Marabá Championship Second Division that year. The team was composed of amateur players, being the most outstanding: Déca, Gamito and Keneddi. The team won the title of the Second Division in 1984, whose conquest gave the team the right to compete in the Marabá Championship First Division the following year.

At this stage of its history the club had as president José Atlas Pinheiro. During this period the team won three municipal bonds in the years 1989, 1992 and 1993. When the last runner-up, the president was already Jorge Nery, who sought for councilor Sebastião Ferreira Neto, in 1999, agreed to professionalize the staff . The proposal won support then president of Federação Paraense de Futebol, Antônio Carlos Nunes, Companhia Vale do Rio Doce and local businesses.

Águia de Marabá is the team most prominent of the interior of Pará, where he remained from 2008 to 2015 in the Campeonato Brasileiro Série C. In the first year for very little not gained access to the second division, being in fifth place overall (only four teams came up).

In 2009, the team gained greater national prominence when he won the Fluminense 2-1 by Copa do Brasil. Before that he had eliminated the América Mineiro, another great tradition team on the national scene.

In Campeonato Paraense, the club was twice runner-up tournament. Losing in 2008 and 2010 for Remo and Paysandu, respectively.

Stadium
Águia de Marabá play their home games at Estádio Municipal Zinho de Oliveira. The stadium has a maximum capacity of 4,500 people.

Rivalries
The regional sports journalism recognizes as its main rival the old team Castanhal Esporte Clube, traditional team of Marabá with which the eagle played three finals municipal championship in 1993, 1996 and 1998. Gavião Kyikatejê, who inherited and owns the rights of Castanheira, has been cited as a main rival, and the games between the teams called Classic of Birds.

Current squad
2022 season team

Honours
 Campeonato Paraense Second Division
 Winners (1): 2015

External links
 Official site

Association football clubs established in 1982
Football clubs in Pará
Marabá
1982 establishments in Brazil